Dr. Ramkrishna Kusmaria (born 30 July 1942) is an Indian politician and a member of  Bharatiya Janata Party (BJP).

He was born in a farming family in Sakor. He joined Indian National Congress on 8 February 2019, then joined the Bharatiya Janata Party (BJP) on 3 July 2020. He was a member of the 10th, 11th, 12th, 13th and 14th Lok Sabha of India. In the 10th, 11th, 12th and 13th Lok Sabha, he represented Damoh constituency and in the 14th Lok Sabha he represented Khajuraho constituency of Madhya Pradesh state. In 2008, he was elected to the Madhya Pradesh Vidhan Sabha from Pathariya Assembly constituency and resigned from the Lok Sabha on 19 December 2008. He was first elected as MLA from Hatta Assembly constituency in Damoh in 1977 as Janata Party candidate. Again in 1985 he was elected as MLA from Hatta Assembly constituency as BJP candidate. Later he was again elected for the third time in 1990 as MLA from Hatta Assembly constituency. In 2008 he changed his constituency from Hatta Assembly constituency to Pathariya constituency and he won the election and became Minister of Farmers Welfare and Agriculture Development in Government of Madhya Pradesh.  He is also a president of Bundelkhand Development Authority from 2016 to 2019.

External links
 Lok Sabha Profile

Living people
1942 births
Bharatiya Janata Party politicians from Madhya Pradesh
People from Damoh
India MPs 2004–2009
People from Chhatarpur district
India MPs 1991–1996
India MPs 1996–1997
India MPs 1998–1999
India MPs 1999–2004
Lok Sabha members from Madhya Pradesh
Madhya Pradesh MLAs 2008–2013
People from Khajuraho